Gormanite is a phosphate mineral with the formula . It was named after the University of Toronto professor Donald Herbert Gorman (1922-2020).

Occurrence
It was first described in 1981 for occurrences in Rapid Creek and Big Fish River in the Dawson Mining District, Yukon Territory, Canada. At the type localities it occurs as veins in iron phosphate nodules. In the Bisbee, Arizona occurrence, it occurs as large crystals within fractures in a tonalite intrusive. It has also been reported from near Newport, Sullivan County, New Hampshire, and the Charles Davis pegmatite, Groton, Grafton County, New Hampshire. It also has been reported from the Tsaobismund pegmatite, south of Karibib, Namibia.

References

External links
OpticalMineralogy.org

Aluminium minerals
Iron(II) minerals
Magnesium minerals
Phosphate minerals
Triclinic minerals
Minerals in space group 1